Strutt is a surname, and may refer to:

 Arthur John Strutt (1818–1888), English painter, engraver, writer and traveler
 Charles Hedley Strutt (1849–1926), British Conservative Party politician, MP for Essex Eastern 1883–85, Maldon 1895–1906 
 Charlotte Strutt, 1st Baroness Rayleigh (1758–1836), British peeress
 Clive Strutt, English composer
 Edward Strutt, 1st Baron Belper (1801–1880), Liberal Party politician
 Edward Lisle Strutt (1874–1948), English mountaineer and Alpine Club president
 George Henry Strutt (1826–1895), cotton manufacturer and philanthropist 
 George Herbert Strutt (1854–1928), cotton manufacturer and philanthropist 
 Jedediah Strutt (1726–1797), hosier and cotton spinner
 John William Strutt, 3rd Baron Rayleigh (1842–1919), English physicist
 Joseph Strutt (engraver and antiquary) (1749–1802), English engraver and antiquary
 Joseph Strutt (philanthropist) (1765–1844), a Derby textile manufacturer and philanthropist
 Robert John Strutt, 4th Baron Rayleigh (1875–1947), English physicist
 William Strutt (artist), Australian artist
 William Strutt (inventor) (1756–1830), inventor and cotton spinner

See also
Strutt's North Mill, Belper, England
The Herbert Strutt School, Belper, England
Strutt & Parker, a UK property consultancy
Strut (disambiguation)